The Ugandan Civil War may refer to:
 Uganda–Tanzania War
 Ugandan Bush War
 War in Uganda (1986–1994)
 Lord's Resistance Army insurgency
 Allied Democratic Forces insurgency